Larry Mahan (born November 21, 1943) is an American former  professional rodeo cowboy. He won six all-around world championships and two bull riding world championships in the Professional Rodeo Cowboys Association (PRCA) circuit at the National Finals Rodeo (NFR). The ProRodeo Hall of Fame inducted him in 1979 in the all-around category. It also inducted him as a Legend of ProRodeo in 2010.

Rodeo career
Larry Mahan was born on November 21, 1943, in Salem, Oregon. He began competing in professional rodeo at the age of 14. He competed in the Rodeo Cowboys Association (RCA) beginning in 1963. Said organization would later be renamed the Professional Rodeo Cowboys Association (PRCA) in 1975. He won the title of World All-Around Champion for five consecutive years from 1966 to 1970, and a sixth time in 1973. His 1973 comeback and competition with Phil Lyne was the subject of the documentary The Great American Cowboy, which won the 1974 Academy Award for Documentary Feature.

In the RCA, he competed and regularly won in saddle bronc riding, bareback riding, and bull riding; he was the first to contest three NFR events in one year. He was the high money winner in bull riding in 1965, and in 1967 won more than $50,000, the first to achieve that level in a single season. In the 1970 season he earned more than $280,000. He had a tough decade in the 1970s, winning an all-around title in 1973 but with injuries sidelining him some of the time.

Mahan earned six all-around titles, but the last one was not consecutive. His consecutive all-around record of five titles was not surpassed until 1979 when Tom Ferguson won his sixth consecutive title. In 1994, Ty Murray broke Mahan's and Ferguson's record of six titles.and tied Ferguson's record of having won six titles consecutively. In 1998, Murray won his seventh title, surpassing both of them and holding the record for all-around titles at seven titles. That's when they started calling Murray "King of the Cowboys." In 2010, Trevor Brazile won his eighth all-around title, surpassing them all. In 2018, Brazile won his 14th all-around title. Mahan was also the World Bull Riding Champion in 1965 and 1967.

Rodeo honors
1966 Rodeo Hall of Fame of the National Cowboy and Western Heritage Museum 
1972 For the 1971 Film/Television - Western Documentary - "Rodeo," Concepts Unlimited, Inc and Contemporary Films/McGraw Hill; Gaby Monet, Producer; Carroll Ballard, Director; Freckles Brown & Larry Mahan, Actors. Bronze Wrangler at the Western Heritage Awards of the National Cowboy & Western Heritage Museum
1979 ProRodeo Hall of Fame
1985 Oregon Sports Hall of Fame
1998  Pendleton Round-Up and Happy Canyon Hall of Fame
1998 St. Paul Rodeo Hall of Fame
1998 PBR Ring of Honor
2001 Ellensburg Rodeo Hall of Fame
2002  Cheyenne Frontier Days Hall of Fame
2005 Texas Trail of Fame
2007 Texas Cowboy Hall of Fame
2007 Received the Ben Johnson Memorial Award
2010 ProRodeo Hall of Fame Legend of ProRodeo
2015 Bull Riding Hall of Fame
2015 Texas Rodeo Cowboy Hall of Fame
 2017 Molalla Walk of Fame
 2019 PBR Ty Murray Top Hand Award

Outside rodeo
Mahan entered the rodeo school market by running a few schools himself. He even had his own brand of Western clothing. After he retired from rodeo in 1977, he bought a ranch near Phoenix, Arizona.

Western wear entrepreneur
Mahan established the Larry Mahan Boot Collection, as well as a clothing line. He also licensed his name to various entities including Tony Lama, Gensco and others. Larry Mahan's Hat Collection has been available from the Milano Hat Company since 1984.

Musician
Larry Mahan is one of the title characters in the song Ramblin' Jack and Mahan by Guy Clark.

In 1976, he released an album on Warner Brothers (BS 2959) entitled Larry Mahan, King of the Rodeo. The songs on the album are:
Freckled Face and Pretty Ribbons
There's More to a Cowboy
Stunt Man
King of the Rodeo
Larry's Salty Dog Blues
Mom's Silver Dollar Saloon
Up Jumped the Devil
Rosie's Palace of Pure Love and Fingertip Massage
Smokey Mountain Cowboy
Ha Ha

Actor
Mahan had a small part in the 1972 Steve Ihnat film The Honkers. In 1975, he appeared in Six Pack Annie.  Mahan co-starred in the 1995 TV movie The Good Old Boys directed by and starring Tommy Lee Jones and also featuring Sissy Spacek, Matt Damon, and Joaquin Jackson.

TV host
Larry Mahan hosted RFD-TV's Equestrian Nation up until 2009.

Cultural references
In the 2007 film No Country for Old Men, Josh Brolin's character asks for and purchases a pair of "Larry Mahans" at a western clothing store, and during a subsequent visit is asked by the clerk how his "Larrys are holding up". He also played in a movie called "The Honkers" (1972) with James Coburn and Slim Pickens.

References

External links
 Larry Mahan interview for the Rodeo Historical Society Oral History Project - YouTube
 Larry Mahan website

1942 births
Living people
Sportspeople from Salem, Oregon
Bull riders
ProRodeo Hall of Fame inductees
Professional Bull Riders: Heroes and Legends
Bareback bronc riders
Saddle bronc riders
All-Around